Fifth Avenue Shoe Repair is a Swedish fashion label founded in 2004 by Astrid Olsson and Lee Cotter. In January 2009 the label received the "Designer of the Year" at the Swedish Elle Style Awards.

The label carries two lines, a ready to wear line as well as a couture inspired line that goes under the name "By the no".

External links
 Web site

Footwear